Sarva Dharma Sammelan ("Meeting of all faiths") is an assembly organized in several places in India. It is generally organized by the Jain community, since it confirms with the anekantavada principle of Jainism.

The best known meeting is held at Dharmasthala every year, where it has been held since 1932. It is organized by Sri Kshetra Dharmasthala led by Veerendra Heggade. It was founded by Manjayya Heggade who was the dharmadhikari during 1918 to 1955.

Other Sammelans have been held at Delhi, Calcutta, Chennai, Jabalpur, Bangalore etc.

The philosopher Osho started his public speaking at the annual Sarva Dharma Sammelan held at Jabalpur since 1939, organized by the Taran Panthi Jain community, in which he was born. He participated from 1951 to 1968.

A Sarva Dharma Sammelan serves to support the view that all religions can coexist in harmony,. 

In 2004, at the 72nd Sarva dharma sammelan at Dharmasthala, the key speakers included:

Karan Singh, former Union Minister
D. Veerendra Heggade, Dharmadhikari of Sri Kshetra
The Union Minister for Energy, P.M. Sayeed,
Aralumallige Parthasarathy, Dasa Sahitya scholar
M. F. Saldanha, former Justice of the Bombay High Court
S. Jeetendra Kumar of Bangalore
Revenue Minister, M.P. Prakash.

At the 2005, the following participated at the Chennai Sarva Dharma Sammelan:

Acharya Shri Mahapragyaji's disciple, Sadhvi Animasriji
Sadhvi Animasriji (Terapanth Jain sect),
Brahma Rishi Guru Anand from Tirupati,
Kazi Mufthi Dr. Salahuddin Mohammed Ayub, Government Chief Kazi,
Father Vincent Chinnadurai, Santhome Communication Centre,
Giani Pratipal Singh, Sri Gurunanak Sat Sangh,
Ven. M. Ratanajothy, monk in charge of Buddhist Temple, Kundrathur,
Rajayogini Brahma Kumari Shantha, Regional Director, Prajapita Brahma Kumaris
Nawab Mohammed Abdul Ali, Prince of Arcot

See also
Parliament of the World's Religions
Anekantavada

References

Interfaith dialogue
Religious organisations based in India
Jain organisations